Senza Paura is the ninth studio album by Italian singer Giorgia.

Track listing

Charts

Certifications

References 

2013 albums
Giorgia (singer) albums